Giuseppe Ferraioli (20 December 1929 – 31 January 2000) was an Italian prelate of the Catholic Church who worked in the diplomatic service of the Holy See.

Biography
Giuseppe Ferraioli was born on 20 December 1929 in Rome. He was ordained a priest on 8 December 1954. 

To prepare for a diplomat’s career he entered the Pontifical Ecclesiastical Academy in 1957.

On 16 June 1976, Pope Paul VI named him Apostolic Pro-nuncio to Ghana.

Cardinal Secretary of State Jean-Marie Villot consecrated him a bishop on 27 June.

On 25 August 1979, Ferraioli was given the additional responsibilities of Apostolic Pro-Nuncio to Benin and Apostolic Delegate to Togo.

Pope John Paul II appointed him Apostolic Pro-Nuncio to Kenya on 21 July 1981.

In 1982 Ferraioli took up a post in Rome at the Secretariat of State. He resigned in 1994 at the age of 64.

He died on 31 January 2000.

References

External links
Catholic Hierarchy: Archbishop Giuseppe Ferraioli  

Apostolic Nuncios to Ghana
Apostolic Nuncios to Togo
Apostolic Nuncios to Kenya
Apostolic Nuncios to Benin
Clergy from Rome
1929 births
2000 deaths
Diplomats from Rome